Sinocyclocheilus wumengshanensis is a species of ray-finned fish in the genus Sinocyclocheilus.

References 

wumengshanensis
Fish described in 2003